The  South Seas Society is a scholarly society in Singapore, which promotes research on Southeast Asia (Nanyang, lit. "South Seas"). The Society was founded in March 1940 as the China South Seas Society. Its founders included Kwan Chu Poh, Yu Dafu, Yao Tse-Liang, Hsu Yun Tsiao, and other scholars and literary figures. 

Former members of the Society's managing committee include: T. L. Yao, Huang Mun-se, Han Wai-toon, Lian Shih-sheng, and Gwee Yee-hean.

The founding of a Chinese society for Southeast Asian studies was unprecedented, as no such organisation or scholarly journal existed in the 1940s. The Society attracted scholars from around the world, including Britain, the US, Japan, China, Hong Kong, India, Indonesia, etc.

Journal of the South Seas Society 
The Society started the Journal of The South Seas Society in 1940, to publish articles, notices, book reviews, etc. on Southeast Asian studies by scholars around the world, in both Chinese and English. Issues of the journal are currently published once a year by World Scientific.

Hsu Yun Ts'iao was the Journal's first editor-in-chief. His successors include Wang Gungwu, Cheng Tsu-yu, and Chen Songzhan.

References

External links
Homepage of the Society

Singaporean culture
Southeast Asia